The 1994 NCAA Division I-AA football rankings are from the Sports Network poll of Division I-AA head coaches, athletic directors, sports information directors and media members.  This is for the 1994 season.

Legend

The Sports Network poll

References

Rankings
NCAA Division I FCS football rankings